In Māori tradition, Tūnui-ā-rangi was one of the great ocean-going, voyaging canoes (or waka) that was used in the migrations that settled New Zealand. The waka is linked to the Ngāi Tāhuhu iwi from the Auckland and Northland regions.

See also
List of Māori waka

Māori waka
Māori mythology